Quest for Fire is a 1981 prehistoric fantasy adventure film directed by Jean-Jacques Annaud, written by Gérard Brach and starring Everett McGill, Ron Perlman, Nameer El-Kadi and Rae Dawn Chong. The Canadian-French co-production is a film adaptation of the 1911 Belgian novel The Quest for Fire by J.-H. Rosny. The story is set in Paleolithic Europe (80,000 years ago), with its plot surrounding the struggle for control of fire by early humans.

The film was critically acclaimed. It won the Academy Award and BAFTA Award for Best Makeup, and the César Awards for Best Film and Best Director. At the 5th Genie Awards, the film was nominated in seven categories and won in five (Best Actress, Best Costume Design, Best Editing, Best Sound Editing, Best Overall Sound).

Plot
The Ulam are a tribe of cavemen who guard a small flame carefully, which they use to start larger fires. After being forced out of their home due to a violent battle with the ape-like Wagabu, the Ulam become terrified when their fire is accidentally put out while seeking refuge in a marsh. Since the tribe does not know how to create fire themselves, the tribal elder decides to send three men, Naoh, Amoukar, and Gaw, on a quest to find fire.

During their journey, the trio encounters several dangers, including the Kzamm, a tribe of more primitive-looking cannibals who possess fire. Naoh, Amoukar, and Gaw plan to steal the fire from them. Gaw and Amoukar lure most of the Kzamm away from their encampment while Naoh kills the remaining warriors, though not before being bitten on the genitals, causing him agony. The three Ulam steal the Kzamm's fire and prepare to return home.

A young woman, Ika, was a captive of the Kzamm and decides to follow the trio. She makes a primitive poultice to help Naoh recover from his injury. Later, Amoukar attempts to mount Ika, but she hides near Naoh, who then mounts her in front of the other two males.

Ika soon realizes that she is near her home and tries to persuade the Ulam to go with her. When they refuse, they go their separate ways. Naoh turns around, followed by the reluctant Gaw and Amoukar, and the group reunites. After Naoh leaves the others to scout a village, he becomes trapped in quicksand, nearly sinking to his death. He is discovered and captured by the Ivaka, Ika's tribe. At first, Naoh is subjected to several forms of humiliation by the Ivaka, including being forced to mate with the high-status women of the tribe, who are large and big-breasted. The petite Ika is excluded by her tribe, and when she attempts to lie near him later that night, she is chased away. The Ivaka show Naoh their advanced knowledge of fire-making with a hand drill.

Gaw and Amoukar eventually find Naoh among the Ivaka and try to rescue him, but Naoh appears unwilling to leave. At night, Ika helps them knock Naoh unconscious and escape the camp. The next day, Naoh washes off the Ivaka body paint. He tries to mount Ika again, but she teaches him the more intimate missionary position. Not long before they reach the marsh where they started the journey, the three are ambushed by rivals from within the Ulam, who want to steal the fire and bring it back themselves. However, Naoh and his group defeat them using the Ivakan atlatls, which are superior to Ulam weapons.

Upon rejoining the Ulam, the group presents the fire to the delight of all. But during the ensuing celebration, the fire is accidentally extinguished again. Naoh attempts to create a new fire as he had seen in the Ivaka camp, but after several failed attempts, Ika takes over. Once the spark is lit, the tribe rejoices.

Months later, Naoh and Ika prepare to have a child.

Cast

 Everett McGill as Naoh
 Ron Perlman as Amoukar
 Nameer El-Kadi as Gaw
 Rae Dawn Chong as Ika
 Gary Schwartz as Rouka
 Naseer El-Kadi as Nam
 Franck-Olivier Bonnet as Aghu
 Jean-Michel Kindt as Lakar
 Kurt Schiegl as Faum
 Brian Gill as Modoc
 Terry Fitt as Hourk
 Bibi Caspari as Gammla
 Peter Elliott as Mikr
 Michelle Leduc as Matr
 Robert Lavoie as Tsor
 Matt Birman as Morah
 Joy Boushel as Sura
 Christian Benard as Umbre
 Tarlok Sing Seva as Tavawa
 Lolamal Kapisisi as Firemaker
 George Buza and Antonio Barichievich as Kzamm tribesmen

Production

Writing and characterization
Special language forms were created by novelist Anthony Burgess, while patterns of movement and gesture were developed by anthropologist Desmond Morris. The more advanced language of the Ivaka was largely that of the Cree/Inuit native people of northern Canada, which caused some amusement among those in this group who saw the film, since the words have little to do with the plot.  The Ulam are portrayed as stereotypical, Neanderthal-style cavemen, in an intermediate stage of development compared to the ape-like Wagabu, on one hand, and the culturally more advanced Ivaka on the other. The Ulam and Ivaka are depicted as light pigmented, the Kzamm as red-haired. The Ivaka are depicted as using body ornamentation (jewelry, body paint, masks, headgear), fully developed language and simple technology such as gourds as vessels and the atlatl.

Filming
The movie was filmed on location in the Scottish Highlands and Tsavo National Park and Lake Magadi in Kenya. The opening sequence was filmed at Cathedral Grove on Vancouver Island, British Columbia, Canada for the forest scenes, whereas the cave home was filmed at Greig's Caves on the Bruce Peninsula along the Niagara Escarpment near Lion's Head, Ontario. Some scenes involving mammoths were filmed in Iceland.

Michael D. Moore was the associate producer in charge of action and animal scenes. Circus elephants were trained for six months to behave like mammoths. When it came time to film them in Iceland, strict laws about transporting four-legged animals into the country delayed their arrival. Then a volcano erupted nearby the ranch where they would have been staying that would have killed the animals had they been there.

Reception

Box office
The film sold almost five million tickets in France.

Critical response
Quest for Fire holds a score of 88% on Rotten Tomatoes based on 24 reviews for an average rating of 7.4/10, the critical consensus stating "Its characters can't do much more than grunt, but that doesn't keep Quest for Fire from offering a deeply resonant -- and surprisingly funny -- look at the beginning of the human race."

Roger Ebert gave the film three-and-a-half stars out of four, writing that he saw it as a "borderline comedy" in the opening scenes, but "then these characters and their quest began to grow on me, and by the time the movie was over I cared very much about how their lives would turn out." Gene Siskel of the Chicago Tribune awarded three stars out of four, stating that "you may be tempted, as I was, to shout wisecracks at the screen. But then the basic appeal of the story begins to work, and every so often we find ourselves asking ourselves, 'I wonder if that's the way it did happen?' And when that happens, 'Quest for Fire' has you hooked." Janet Maslin of The New York Times wrote that the film was "more than just a hugely entertaining science lesson, although it certainly is that. It's also a touching, funny and suspenseful drama about prehumans." Sheila Benson of the Los Angeles Times wrote that she did not know how historically accurate the movie was, "But this is film making, not carbon dating, and it seems that every piece of magic and the skill of every craft has been used to free our imagination, to let it soar with the film to see what life may have been like 80,000 years ago." Pauline Kael of The New Yorker wrote, "It's almost impossible to guess what the tone of this ape-man love story (based on a French novel, by J. H. Rosny, Sr.) is intended to be. Are we meant to laugh at the gaminess? At the men's werewolf foreheads? (Thick hair sprouts about an inch above their eyebrows.) The director, Jean-Jacques Annaud, seems to be willing for us to laugh but not sure about how to tell us when."

Scientific response
The film was not intended to be a scientifically accurate documentary of a specific point in pre-history. This is reinforced by the response of the scientific community. In an essay for the journal American Anthropologist, Brown University linguistics professor Philip Lieberman described as "absurd" the mixture of different levels of advancement among different tribes living in close proximity. Lieberman pointed out that it "would be most unlikely 80,000 years ago" for humans to still be exhibiting apelike characteristics, at the same time noting that the Ivaka tribe was depicted as having "a village culture that would have been likely 10,000 years ago."

Accolades
The film was nominated for six César Awards in 1981, including Best Original Screenplay or Adaptation for Gérard Brach, Best Music Written for a Movie for Philippe Sarde, Best Cinematography for Claude Agostini, and Best Sets for Brian Morris, winning those for Best Film and Best Director. In 1983 it won the Academy Award for Best Makeup. Also in 1983, it won in five categories in the Genie Awards.

See also
 The Clan of the Cave Bear
 Dance of the Tiger
 The Inheritors (Golding novel)
 List of historical period drama films and series
 Shaman (novel)
 Survival film, about the film genre, with a list of related films

References

Works cited

External links

 
 
 
 

1981 drama films
1980s fantasy adventure films
1981 films
20th Century Fox films
BAFTA winners (films)
Films shot in Kenya
Films shot in Scotland
Films set in Europe
Fictional-language films
Films about hunter-gatherers
Films based on Belgian novels
Films directed by Jean-Jacques Annaud
Best Film César Award winners
Films whose director won the Best Director César Award
Films that won the Academy Award for Best Makeup
Films without speech
Films set in prehistory
Films about cavemen
Films with screenplays by Gérard Brach
Cannibalism in fiction
Fiction about neanderthals
Films produced by John Kemeny
Films scored by Philippe Sarde
Canadian survival films
Historical fantasy films
1980s historical fantasy films
Canadian fantasy adventure films
Canadian epic films
French epic films
French historical fantasy films
1980s Canadian films
1980s French films